Salvador Dijols (11 November 1940 in Ponce, Puerto Rico– 2 August 2010 in Río Piedras, Puerto Rico)  was a Puerto Rican basketball player.

References

1940 births
2010 deaths
Puerto Rican men's basketball players
1959 FIBA World Championship players
1963 FIBA World Championship players
Basketball players at the 1959 Pan American Games
Basketball players at the 1963 Pan American Games
Pan American Games medalists in basketball
Pan American Games silver medalists for Puerto Rico
Pan American Games bronze medalists for Puerto Rico
Medalists at the 1963 Pan American Games
20th-century Puerto Rican people